Actites, commonly known as the dune thistle, beach thistle or coastal sow thistle, is a genus of flowering plants in the family Asteraceae.  It is endemic to Australia and contains only one species, Actites megalocarpa . It is a large, clumping herb with yellow flowers.

Description
Actites megalocarpus is a fleshy perennial herb. The bracts are narrow-triangular shaped, the lower midrib of outer bracts has spines.

Taxonomy and naming
Actites megalocarpus was first formally described in 1976 by Nicholas Sean Lander and the description was published in Telopea. The specific epithet (megalocarpus) means "large fruited".

Distribution and habitat
Dune thistle is usually found on coastal dunes and cliffs from Toorbul in Queensland to Middleton Beach in Western Australia and the south-east coast of Tasmania.

References

Flora of Victoria (Australia)
Flora of New South Wales
Flora of Queensland
Flora of Tasmania
Eudicots of Western Australia
Flora of South Australia
Monotypic Asteraceae genera
Plants described in 1976